Biron Mill is a pulp mill and paper mill located in the US town of Biron, Wisconsin, in the outskirts of Wisconsin Rapids. Part of Catalyst Paper, the mill has two paper machines which produce 390,000 tonnes annually of coated groundwood paper. The mill has 425 employees as of 2015.

Biron Mill was established in 1895 by the Grand Rapids Pulp and Paper Company. It originally focused on production of wallpaper. Ownership passed to Consolidated Water Power and Paper Company in 1911, which became Consolidated Papers in 1962. The company was bought by Stora Enso in 2000, who demerged its North American division in 2007 through a sale to NewPage. Catalyst Paper bought the mill in 2015.

References

Pulp and paper mills in the United States
Buildings and structures in Wood County, Wisconsin
1895 establishments in Wisconsin
Catalyst Paper
Industrial buildings completed in 1895